Horodyshche is a village in Ternopil Raion, Ternopil Oblast (province) of western Ukraine. It belongs to Ternopil urban hromada, one of the hromadas of Ukraine.

History
In 1939–1962, the village belonged to the Velykyi Hlybochok Raion, 1963-2018 - Zboriv Raion, center of the Horodyshche Rural Council.

There is a church of the Assumption of the Mary (1906).

Until 18 July 2020, Horodyshche belonged to Zboriv Raion. The raion was abolished in July 2020 as part of the administrative reform of Ukraine, which reduced the number of raions of Ternopil Oblast to three. The area of Zboriv Raion was merged into Ternopil Raion.

Population
Population in 1880: 510 inhabitants.
Population in 1910: 656 inhabitants.
Population in 1931: 536 inhabitants.
Population in 1970: 336 inhabitants with over 115 houses.
Population in 2003: 129 inhabitants.
Population in 2014: 112 inhabitants with over 89 houses.

They were born in Horodyshche:
painter Yevstakhiy Biliavskyi (d. 1804),
UGA officer Mykola Mazurevych (1895–1937),
teacher Bohdan Shyliha (b. 1946),
mechanical engineer of the food industry, teacher Maria Shynkaryk (b. 1954),
engineer-geologist Petro Shynkaryk (1929–1995),
ex-head of the main department of agro-industrial development of Ternopil Oblast State Administration Andrii Khoma (b. 1951).

Lived the priest, writer Tymofiy Borduliak (1863–1936).

References

Notes

Sources

External links

Ternopil urban hromada
Villages in Ternopil Raion